Tulun may refer to:
Tulun, town and administrative center of Tulunsky District, Irkutsk Oblast, Russia 
Tulun, Iran, a village in Ardabil Province, Iran
Tulun, Zanjan, a village in Zanjan Province, Iran
Tulun, Carteret Islands or Kilinailau, atoll in the South Pacific

See also
Ahmad ibn Tulun (835–884), founder of the Tulunid dynasty, which ruled Egypt briefly 868–905
Mosque of Ibn Tulun, Cairo, Egypt, commissioned by Ahmad ibn Tulun